Gerdkuh was a castle of the Nizari Isma'ili state located near Damghan in the region of Qumis (modern-day Semnan Province of Iran).

Gerdkuh is a "fortified mountain"—a high vertical rock of 300 m in height with buildings on its summit and fortifications at its sides, defended by a triple ring of fortifications at its foot, making the citadel impregnable to direct military assault. It was originally a small fort acquired and refortified in 1096 AD by a Seljuq commander who was secretly a Nizari. The fortress served as a place of refuge for the families of the Nizaris, and its strategic location in the middle of the Khorasan Road made it a useful base for collecting taxes from the passing caravans of the Silk Road.

Gerdkuh resisted the Mongol invasion of 1253 AD for 17 years, becoming the last Nizari stronghold in Persia to fall. The fortress remained in use until the early Safavid period. Among the major Nizari fortresses, Gerdkuh is the least studied one.

Name
The word Girdkūh is a compound of gird for "circular" (round) and kūh for "mountain". It is named this due to the circular shape of the mountain peak.

In the Chinese work History of Yuan, Gerdkuh is recorded multiple times, as Yü-r-gu, K‘i-du-bu, K‘i-du-bu-gu, and Gir-r-du-k‘ie, on top of the mount Yen-han, west of Tan-han (Damghan). The fortress is called Tigado by Hayton of Corycus.

The fortress is also known as Dezh-e Gonbadān, literally "fortress of the domes"). The Gonbadān-Dezh mentioned in Shahnama, in which Isfandiyar was imprisoned, may be identified with Gerdkuh.

Description

It is best approached via the nearby village Hajjiabad-e Razveh.

Apart from the east, the slopes are almost impossible to scale and no defensive works were necessary. The steepness of the rock and its height has been noted in the work History of Yuan, which claims no arrows or mangonel stones could reach it.

Their purpose may include the protection of the cultivated fertile ground on the castle's foot, and tax-collecting bases for passing caravans, as well as a more conventional and accessible place of storage relative to the buildings at the hilltop.

A rectangular outer gatehouse on the southern side apparently served as a reception post. The proper entrance is, however, via the main gatehouse on the eastern side. It featured two round turrets on each side made of smooth dressed stones. The outer ramp leading to this gate was probably built by the besieging Mongols. There is a spring just above this gatehouse. Via a line of defenses it leads to an inner gatehouse which defends the only possible ascent to the main castle. The mountain fortifications are defended with double walls built between towers. Natural perpendicular drops increased their effectiveness.

The mountain top has its own fortifications. Its base is built with dressed blocks of stone and features a well in the middle. The main inhabited area, which is visible from the plain, was a complex of two rows of buildings on the south-eastern slope, all of them at least two or three stories high. On the north-east, there is a late mud wall with little remnants of buildings. On the south-west there is a cistern and remains of a defensive tower. There are more cisterns and wells elsewhere within the fortifications.

History

The fortress probably dates back to the pre-Islamic period. Gerdkuh was situated on the Khorasan Road and guarded the routes toward the Alborz mountain range.

Seljuk period 

Gerdkuh was refortified and transferred into the Nizari Isma'ili possession in 1100 by Ra'is Mu'ayyad al-Din Muzaffar ibn Ahmad Mustawfi, a secret Isma'ili convert and lieutenant of the Seljuq emir Amirdad Habashi, who in turn had acquired Gedrkuh in 1096 from Sultan Barkiyaruq. Now under Hassan-i Sabbah, Muzaffar continued as the commandant of the stronghold until being succeeded by his son Sharaf al-Din Muhammad.

Muzaffar reportedly dug an extremely deep well in the fort but did not reach the water. Years later, water gushed out after an earthquake.

In 528 AH (Islamic year) during the reign of Sultan Ahmad Sanjar, Gerdkuh was besieged by amir Arghush. As the castle ran out of provisions, they bribed the amir to abandon the siege.

Khwarezmshahian period 
During the Mongol invasion, Sultan Muhammad II of Khwarazm retreated to Ray. The Mongol commander Subutai followed him, and as he reached Damghan, some of the city elites sought refuge in Nizaris' Gerdkuh.

The Mongol siege

In March 1253, Hülegü's commander Kitbuqa, who was commanding the advance guard, crossed Oxus (Amu Darya) with 12,000 men (one tümen plus two mingghans under Köke Ilgei). In April 1253, he captured several Nizari fortresses in Quhistan and killed their inhabitants, and in May he attacked Qumis and laid siege to Gerdkuh with 5,000 men and build walls and siege works around it. Kitbuqa left an army under amir Büri to besiege Gerdkuh.

In December 1253, Girdkuh's garrison sallied at night and killed 100 (or several hundred) Mongols, including Büri. In the summer of 1254, an outbreak of cholera in Gerdkuh weakened the garrison's resistance. However, unlike Lambsar, Gerdkuh survived the epidemic and was saved by the arrival of reinforcements from Ala al-Din Muhammad in Alamut.

As Hülegü's main army was advancing in Iran, Khurshah ordered Gerdkuh and fortresses of Quhistan to surrender. The Nizari chief in Gerdkuh, Qadi Tajuddin Mardanshah, surrendered, but the garrison continued to resist. In 1256, Maymun-Diz and Alamut surrendered and were destroyed by the Mongols, resulting in the official disestablishment of the Nizari Ismaili state. Khurshah was in the custody of the Mongols. As his position became intolerable, he asked Hülegü to be allowed to go meet Möngke in Mongolia to persuade the remaining Ismaili fortresses to surrender. Möngke rebuked him due to his failure to hand over Lambsar and Gerdkuh, and ordered a general massacre of all Nizari Ismailis, including Khurshah.

The Mongols had built permanent buildings, houses, and defensive walls near Gerdkuh, the ruins of which still remain today in Hajjiabad-e Razveh and other nearby villages. Two types of stones used for Nizari and Mongol mangonels were visible on the northeastern slope as of 1985. There are also remains of the Mongol siege works in the plain between Hajjiabad-e Razveh and Gerdkuh.

On 15 December 1270, during the reign of Abaqa, the garrison of Gerdkuh surrendered from want of clothing. It was thirteen years after the fall of Alamut, and seventeen years after its first siege by Kitbuqa. The Mongols killed the surviving garrison but did not destroy the fortress.

After the Mongol takeover

Gerdkuh reappears only once in historical records in 1384, when it was briefly captured by the rebellious governor Amir Vali of Astarabad. It was probably completely abandoned in the early Safavid period.

Modern studies

The Qajar king Naser al-Din Shah (1848–1896) encouraged Shaykh Mohammad Mehdi Abdol-Rabb-Abadi to investigate the site, whose brief report contains accurate measurements.

The site was visited multiple times by Peter Wiley, who left a detailed description in his book Eagle's Nest. In 1967 the site was reported to be covered with shards and artifacts; few of them were remaining in the following year. No archeological survey of the ruins has been made as of 2012. Among major Nizari castles, Gerdkuh is the least studied one.

See also
Muhammad (Bavandid ruler)
Kafer Ghal'eh of Sangsar (Mehdishahr)

References

External links 
 

Castles in Iran
Forts in Iran
Castles of the Nizari Ismaili state
Qumis (region)
Sieges involving the Mongol Empire
Nizari Ismaili–Seljuk relations
Earthquakes in the medieval Islamic world